Edis Maliqi (born 4 May 1996) is a Macedonian professional footballer of Albanian origin who plays as a defender for Albanian Superliga club Dinamo Tirana .

Club career

Kukësi
On 7 June 2018, Albanian club Kukësi announced to have signed Maliqi for an undisclosed fee. He took squad number 24, and was included in the squad for the UEFA Champions League campaign, where they faced Valletta in the first qualifying round; he was an unused substitute in both legs as Kukësi managed to progress on away goal rule. He made his competitive debut for the club on 25 July in the first leg of second qualifying round versus Qarabağ which ended in a goalless draw.

Maliqi also played in the returning leg at Tofiq Bahramov Republican Stadium, which was lost 3–0, solidifying his position in the starting lineup. Kukësi then continued in the UEFA Europa League, facing Georgia's Torpedo Kutaisi in the third qualifying round. Maliqi was included in the team to travel to Georgia for the first leg, but his visa and Valon Ethemi, Reginaldo and Faton Maloku's was denied the Georgian authorities. Maliqi eventually did not play, as Kukësi lost 5–2. He returned for the second leg and played full-90 minutes, and despite Kukësi winning 2–0 win at Elbasan Arena, they were eliminated on aggregate.

Maliqi made his Albanian Superliga appearance on 19 August by playing in the 1–1 draw versus Laçi in the opening matchday.

International career
Maliqi begun his international career in September 2012 by playing in two friendlies versus Poland; the first match was won 1–0 while the second was lost with the same result.

Career statistics

References

External links
FSHF profile

Edis Maliqi at Soccerway

1996 births
Living people
Sportspeople from Veles, North Macedonia
Albanian footballers from North Macedonia
Association football defenders
Macedonian footballers
North Macedonia youth international footballers
FK Rabotnički players
FK Shkupi players
FK Kukësi players
Macedonian First Football League players
Kategoria Superiore players
Macedonian expatriate footballers
Expatriate footballers in Albania
Macedonian expatriate sportspeople in Albania